Deramas jasoda is a butterfly in the family Lycaenidae. It was described by Lionel de Niceville in 1889. It is found in  the Indomalayan realm.

Subspecies
D. j. jasoda – de Nicéville, 1889 (Burma, Thailand, Mergui, Langkawi)
D. j. bradamante – Doherty, 1890  (Peninsular Malaya, Borneo, Sumatra)
D. j. herdi – Cassidy, 1985  (Brunei)

References

External links

Deramas at Markku Savela's Lepidoptera and Some Other Life Forms

Deramas
Butterflies described in 1889